Alan Raymond Geddes (7 August 1912 – 27 January 1993) was a New Zealand athlete. He represented his country at the 1938 British Empire Games in Sydney, finishing seventh in the 3-mile race and fourth in the 6-mile event. He placed second in the New Zealand cross-country championship on no fewer that four occasions, but never won the event. In 1945 he won the 1-mile title at the New Zealand athletics championships, in a time of 4:30.2.

On 26 October 1939, Geddes married Flora Margaret Dorward Pyott at First Church, Dunedin. He died at Dunedin Hospital in 1993.

References

1912 births
1993 deaths
New Zealand male middle-distance runners
New Zealand male long-distance runners
Commonwealth Games competitors for New Zealand
Athletes (track and field) at the 1938 British Empire Games
New Zealand male cross country runners